Polycystin 1 (often abbreviated to PC1) is a protein that in humans is encoded by the PKD1 gene. Mutations of PKD1 are associated with most cases of autosomal dominant polycystic kidney disease, a severe hereditary disorder of the kidneys characterised by the development of renal cysts and severe kidney dysfunction.

Protein structure and function 

PC1 is a membrane-bound protein 4303 amino acids in length expressed largely upon the primary cilium, as well as apical membranes, adherens junctions, and desmosomes. It has 11 transmembrane domains, a large extracellular N-terminal domain, and a short (about 200 amino acid) cytoplasmic C-terminal domain. This intracellular domain contains a coiled-coil domain through which PC1 interacts with polycystin 2 (PC2), a membrane-bound Ca2+-permeable ion channel.

PC1 has been proposed to act as a G protein–coupled receptor. The C-terminal domain may be cleaved in a number of different ways. In one instance, a ~35 kDa portion of the tail has been found to accumulate in the cell nucleus in response to decreased fluid flow in the mouse kidney. In another instance, a 15 kDa fragment may be yielded, interacting with transcriptional activator and co-activator STAT6 and p100, or components of the canonical Wnt signaling pathway in an inhibitory manner. 

The structure of the human PKD1-PKD2 complex has been solved by cryo-electron microscopy, which showed a 1:3 ratio of PKD1 and PKD2 in the structure. PKD1 consists of a voltage-gated ion channel  fold that interacts with PKD2. 

PC1 mediates mechanosensation of fluid flow by the primary cilium in the renal epithelium and of mechanical deformation of articular cartilage.

Gene 

Splice variants encoding different isoforms have been noted for PKD1. The gene is closely linked to six pseudogenes in a known duplicated region on chromosome 16p.

References

External links 
  GeneReviews/NIH/NCBI/UW entry on Polycystic Kidney Disease, Autosomal Dominant

EF-hand-containing proteins
Ion channels